Zabrodzie  is a village in Wyszków County, Masovian Voivodeship, in east-central Poland. It is the seat of the gmina (administrative district) called Gmina Zabrodzie.

References

Villages in Wyszków County